Eva Illouz (born April 30, 1961 in Fes, Morocco) is a professor of sociology at the Hebrew University in Jerusalem and the School for Advanced Studies in the Social Sciences in Paris. She was the first woman president of Bezalel Academy of Art and Design.

Biography
Eva Illouz was born in Fes, Morocco, and moved to France at the age of ten with her parents. She received a B.A. in sociology, communication and literature in Paris, an M.A. in literature in Paris, an M.A. in communication from the Hebrew University, and received her PhD in communications and cultural studies at the Annenberg School for Communication of the University of Pennsylvania in 1991.  Her mentor was Prof. Larry Gross, currently in 2021 the head of the Annenberg School of Communications at USC. 

She has served as a visiting professor at Northwestern University, Princeton University, the School for Advanced Studies in the Social Sciences in Paris (École des Hautes Études en Sciences Sociales) and as a fellow at the Institute for Advanced Study in Berlin (Wissenschaftskolleg zu Berlin). Illouz was one of the founders of the Program for Cultural Studies at the Hebrew University. In 2006, Illouz joined the Center for the Study of Rationality, then headed by Prof. Edna Ullman-Margalit. In 2012 she was named first woman President of the Bezalel Academy of Art and Design in which she stayed until 2015.

Academic career
She taught at Tel Aviv University until 2000. In 2004, she joined Hebrew University's Center for the Study of Rationality, then headed by  Israel Aumann. She holds the Rose Isaac Chair in Sociology at the Hebrew University of Jerusalem.

In 2008 she was a fellow of the Berlin Institute for Advanced Study. From 2012 until 2015 she was the first woman president of Bezalel Academy of Art and Design.
She has been Directrice d'Etudes at the École des Hautes Études en Sciences Sociales in Paris since 2015. In 2016, Illouz was the Hedi Fritz Niggli Guest Professor at Zürich University. In 2019, she was the Niklas Luhmann Guest Professor in Bielefeld.

Eva Illouz is fluent in Hebrew, German, French and English. She is the author of 13 books and a regular contributor to Ha'aretz, Le Monde and Die Zeit.

Awards and recognition
Her book Consuming the Romantic Utopia won Honorable Mention for the Best Book Award at the American Sociological Association, 2000 (emotions section). Her book Oprah Winfrey and the Glamour of Misery won the Best Book Award, American Sociological Association, 2005 Culture Section. In 2004, Illouz received the Outstanding research award of the Hebrew University of Jerusalem. In the same year, Illouz delivered the Adorno lectures at the Institute for Social Research in Frankfurt. In 2009, the German newspaper Die Zeit chose her as one of the 12 thinkers most likely to "change the thought of tomorrow". In 2013, she received the Annaliese Meier International Award for Excellence in Research from the Alexander von Humboldt Foundation.  Her book Why Love Hurts won the best book award of the Alpine Philosophy Society in France. It is also the recipient of the 2014 Sociology of Emotions Outstanding Recent Contribution Award. In 2018, Illouz received the E.M.E.T award [1], the highest scientific distinction in Israel. In July 2018, she was also made Chevalier de la Légion d'honneur [2] in France.

Illouz is the author of numerous books and articles that have been translated into 18 languages.

Research topics
In her latest works she has increasingly focused on the impact of capitalism on sexuality and emotions.

Capitalism and emotional patterns 
One dominant theme concerns the ways in which capitalism has transformed emotional patterns, in the realms of both consumption and production.

Romance and commodities 
Illouz’ first book addresses the commodification of romance and the romanticization of commodities. Looking at a wide sample of movies and advertising images in women's magazines of the 1930s, advertising and cinematic culture presented commodities as the vector for emotional experiences and particularly the experience of romance. Commodities of many kinds were presented as enabling the experience of love and romance. The second process was that of the commodification of romance, the process by which the 19th-century practice of calling on a woman, that is going to her home, was replaced by dating: going out and consuming the increasingly powerful industries of leisure. Romantic encounters moved from the home to the sphere of consumer leisure with the result that the search for romantic love was made into a vector for the consumption of leisure goods produced by expanding industries of leisure.

Oprah Winfrey and the Glamour of Misery: An Essay on Popular Culture (2003) 
In her third book, Illouz analyzes one of the most fascinating phenomena of the 1990s – television talk shows and the persona of Oprah Winfrey. The books responds to a question that perplexed sociologists as well as the public at large: How did Oprah Winfrey become such a global feminine icon?

Cold Intimacies: The Making of Emotional Capitalism (2007) 
This book analyzes and, eventually, changes the common (sociological) conception, which claims that capitalism has created an unemotional world which is dominated by bureaucratic rationality; that economical behavior is in conflict with intimacy and authentic relationships; that public and private spheres are opposed and irreconcilable with one another; and that true love is opposed to calculations and private interests.
Against such suppositions, Illouz claims that the culture of capitalism has nurtured a powerful emotional culture – in own work place, in the family, and in our relations with ourselves. Economical relations have become emotional, while close and intimate relationships have become more and more defined by economical and models of contractualism and profit making.

Saving the Modern Soul: Therapy, Emotions and the Culture of Self-Help (2008)
The book is a direct continuation and expansion of the Adorno Lectures and of Illouz’s ongoing interest in the interaction between emotions, capitalism and popular (or media) culture. This book delves into the reasons why the discourse of therapy, which has been developed by academic scientists, quickly became the privileged language for the self. 

Her subsequent books show that her research becomes increasingly diversified: one part continues to ask what makes cultural items take on global popularity and success (Hard Core Romance); another part of her research continues to explore the effect of capitalism on love and romantic emotions (Why Love Hurts and The End of Love); a third aspect of her research deal with Israel and the demise of democratic civic culture in that country (Israel: Sociological Essay); a fourth part deals with the effects of psychology on society with Manufacturing Happy Citizens. Finally, thanks a Chair in Excellence awarded by Paris Sciences Lettres in France (PSL) and the Annaliese Maier Award for Excellence in Research awarded by the Humboldt Foundation, she elaborated the notion of emodity, a form of commodity whose use value is to elicit specific emotions.

Clinical psychology and modern identity 
Illouz argues that psychology has been central to the constitution of modern identity and to modern emotional life: from the 1920s to the 1960s clinical psychologists became an extraordinarily dominant social group as they entered the army, the corporation, the school, the state, social services, the media, child rearing, sexuality, marriage, church pastoral care. In all of these realms, psychology established itself as the ultimate authority in matters of human distress by offering techniques to transform and overcome that distress. Psychologists of all persuasions have provided the main narrative of self-development for the 20th century. The psychological persuasion has transformed what was classified as a moral problem into a disease and may thus be understood as part and parcel of the broader phenomenon of the medicalization of social life. What is common to theme 1 and theme 2 is that both love and psychological health constitute utopias of happiness for the modern self, that both are mediated through consumption and that both constitute horizons to which the modern self aspires. In that sense, one overarching theme of her work can be called the utopia of happiness and its interaction with the utopia of consumption.

Architecture or ecology of choice 
At the center of Why Love Hurts is the notion of choice. The book makes the somewhat counter-intuitive claim that one of the most fruitful ways to understand the transformation of love in modernity is through the category of choice. Illouz views choice as the defining cultural hallmark of modernity because in the economic and political arenas, choice embodies the two faculties that justify the exercise of freedom, namely rationality and autonomy. She extends this insight to the emotional realm and studies the various mechanisms through which in modernity choice of a mate have changed and have transformed the emotions active in the will of partners who meet in a market situation. In this sense, choice is one of the most powerful cultural and institutional vectors helping us understand modern individualism. Given that choice is intrinsic to modern individuality, how and why people choose – or not – to enter a relationship is crucial to understanding love as an emotion and a relationship.

This approach differs from that of economists and psychologists for whom choice is a natural feature of the exercise of rationality, a fixed and invariant property of the mind, as the capacity to rate preferences, to act consistently based on these hierarchized preferences. Yet, choice in general and choice of a mate in particular is no less shaped by culture than are other features of action. This is a theme Illouz has developed especially since becoming a member of the Center for the Study for Rationality at the Hebrew University in 2006.

Emotional development and  happiness 
One dimension of Illouz’ work has been to understand the intersection of social class and emotion in two ways. First, how does class shape emotional practices? Are there emotional forms which we can associate with social domination? And second: If emotions are strategic responses to situations – that is, if they help us cope with situations and to shape them – do middle and upper-middle classes have an advantage over the poor and the destitute in the emotional realm? How do they establish this advantage and what is its nature?

Published works
1997: Consuming the Romantic Utopia: Love and the Cultural Contradictions of Capitalism. Berkeley: University of California Press. (371 pp.). (Trad. esp.: El consumo de la utopía romántica, Buenos Aires/Madrid, Katz editores S.A, 2009)
2002: The Culture of Capitalism (in Hebrew). Israel University Broadcast (110 pp.).
2003: Oprah Winfrey and the Glamour of Misery: An Essay on Popular Culture. Columbia University Press (300 pp.) 
2007: Cold Intimacies: The Making of Emotional Capitalism. Polity Press. London. (Trad. esp.: Intimidades congeladas, Buenos Aires/Madrid, Katz editores S.A, 2007)
2008: Saving the Modern Soul: Therapy, Emotions, and the Culture of Self-Help/ The University of California Press. 
 2011: Who needs democracy anyway?, Haaretz.
 2011: Neutrality is political, Haaretz.
 2011: A collapse of trust, Haaretz.
2012: Why Love Hurts: A Sociological Explanation Polity  (appeared first in German: Warum Liebe weh tut. Suhrkamp Verlag, Berlin 2011 ). 
2014: Hard Core Romance: Fifty Shades of Grey, Best Sellers and Society, University of Chicago Press.  (in German: Die neue Liebesordnung: Frauen, Männer und Shades of Grey. Suhrkamp Verlag, Berlin 2013. )
2015: Israel – Sociological Essays, Suhrkamp Verlag, Berlin. 
2018: Emotions as Commodities: How Commodities Became Authentic. Routledge  (appeared first in German: Wa(h)re Gefühle – Authentizität im Konsumkapitalismus, Suhrkamp Verlag, Berlin. )
2018: Unloving: A Sociology of Negative Relations. Oxford University Press, forthcoming (appeared first in German: Warum Liebe endet – Eine Soziologie negativer Beziehungen, Suhrkamp Verlag, Berlin. )
2018: Happycracy: How the Industry of Happiness controls our lives. Polity Press, forthcoming (appeared first in French: Happycratie: Comment l’Industrie du Bonheur contrôle notre vie Premier Parallèle Editeur, Paris. )

See also
Women in Israel

References

External links
 Illouz homepage at the Hebrew University

Further reading
 "Love in the Time of Capital", an interview with Illouz in Guernica Magazine 6 January 2010
 Interview with Eva Illouz, in Barcelona Metropolis, 2010.
 Review of Saving the Modern Soul, by Helena Béjar in Barcelona Metropolis, 2010.
 Yehouda Shenhav (May 16, 2003), Where culture and capitalism coalesce, Haaretz.
 Yuval Saar and Hagit Saad (February 25, 2011), Alone together, Haaretz.
 Zur Person (October 11, 2011), Soziologin Illouz: "Macht euren Kinderwunsch nicht von Liebe abhängig!", Der Spiegel (German)
 "How to Find Emotional Certainty in a World of Sexual Uncertainty," an excerpt drawn and adapted from chapter two of Eva Illouz's Hard-Core Romance: Fifty Shades of Grey, Best-Sellers, and Society, published by the University of Chicago Press, 2015.

Academic staff of the Hebrew University of Jerusalem
Israeli sociologists
Israeli women sociologists
1961 births
Living people
Israeli critics
Israeli essayists
Israeli women writers
Israeli women academics
Israeli Jews
Israeli communists
Israeli socialists
Jewish socialists
Israeli Marxists
Hebrew University of Jerusalem alumni
Annenberg School for Communication at the University of Pennsylvania alumni
Academic staff of the School for Advanced Studies in the Social Sciences
University of Paris alumni
Academic staff of Bezalel Academy of Arts and Design
Academic staff of Tel Aviv University
People from Fez, Morocco
Israeli people of Moroccan-Jewish descent
20th-century Moroccan Jews